Samson Young (born 1979) is a Hong Kong artist, working primarily in the mediums of sound performance and installations.

Early life and education 
Samson Young was born in Hong-Kong. He received both his BA degree in Music, Philosophy and Gender Studies and his M.Phil in Music Composition from The University of Hong Kong, and his PhD in music composition from Princeton University.

He was an assistant professor in sonic art and physical computing at the School of Creative Media, City University of Hong Kong. Young is also the principal investigator at the Laboratory for Ubiquitous Musical Expression (L.U.M.E), and artistic director of the experimental sound advocacy organization Contemporary Musiking.

Work 
While Young's background is in music composition, his work as an artist spans a broad range of media, including performance, sound, video, drawing, and wall transfers. Young's work is frequently political in nature, addressing military history and the British occupation of Hong-Kong as subjects.

Nocturnal Music, the artist's 2015 exhibition at Team Gallery, centered on a performance, in which the artist sat at a desk for six hours every day, watching muted video footage of night-time airstrikes by the United States on the Middle East and re-creating the audio via foley effects, which he broadcast locally via a pirate FM radio channel.

Career and recognition 
In 2015, Young was the inaugural recipient of the BMW Art Journey Award. Major exhibitions include A Dark Theme Keeps Me Here, I'll Play a Broken Music, at Kunsthalle Düsseldorf in 2017, and the Hong-Kong pavilion at the 57th Venice Biennale.

Selected exhibitions

Solo exhibitions 
2021 – The World Falls Apart Into Facts, Ota Fine Arts, Tokyo, Japan

2020 – MAM Collection 012: Samson Young, Mori Art Museum, Tokyo, Japan

2019 – Samson Young - It's a heaven over there, Centre A Vancouver International Centre for Contemporary Asian Art, Vancouver, BC 

2018 – Songs for Disaster Relief World Tour, M+ Pavilion, Hong Kong

2017 – Furniture Music, Gallerie Gisela Capitain, Cologne, Germany

2017 – Songs for Disaster Relief, Hong Kong Pavilion, Venice Biennale

2016 – A Dark Theme Keeps Me Here, I'll Make A Broken Music, Kunsthalle Düsseldorf, Germany

2016 – The Mastery of Language Affords Remarkable Power,  Experimenter Gallery, Kolkata, India

2016 – Orchestrations, Connecting Space (presented by Para Site), Hong Kong

2015 – Pastoral Music, Team Gallery, New York City

2015 – Video Program: Samson Young, Hiroshima City Museum of Contemporary Art, Japan

2015 – Avant-garde on speed, TKG+ gallery, Taipei

2015 – Pastoral Music, Discovery, Art Basel Hong Kong

2015 – MTVs, a.m. space, Hong Kong

2014 – I wanted to see everything: the Liquid Borders Project, a.m. space, Hong Kong

2013 – On the Musically Beautiful, Goethe-Institute, Hong Kong

2011 – Machines for Making Nothing, Cogut Center for Humanities, Brown University, USA

Awards 
2019 - Prix Ars Electronica (Sound Art and Digital Music Category), Award of Distinction

2018 -  Honorary Fellowship, Hong Kong Art Centre

2015 - BMW Art Journey Award

2013 - Artist of the Year (Media Art Category), Hong Kong Arts Development Council

2012 - Prix Ars Electronica (Sound Art and Digital Music Category), Honorary Mention

2012 - Japan Media Art Festival (Interactive Art Category), Jury Selection Award

2009 - New York Society for New Music, Brian M. Israel Prize

2007 - Bloomberg Emerging Artist Award

References

External links 
 Samson Young's website
 Team Gallery
 Galerie Gisela Capitain
 Profile of Samson Young in Artforum
Profile of Samson Young in Edouard Malingue

1979 births
Living people
Interdisciplinary artists
Sound artists
Hong Kong people
Princeton University alumni
Alumni of the University of Hong Kong
Hong Kong artists